Charles Joseph Berry (September 6, 1860 – January 22, 1940) was an American second baseman in Major League Baseball whose career consisted of one season in the Union Association. He was born in Elizabeth, New Jersey.

In his one season, Berry batted .224 (38-for-170) with one home run and 21 runs in 43 games played. After the conclusion of his professional sports career, he worked for the Ingersoll Rand Company.

Berry died in Phillipsburg, New Jersey at the age of 79, and was buried at the Mount Olivet Cemetery in Elizabeth, New Jersey.

His son, Charlie Jr., was more successful in professional sports. He played both baseball and football on a major league level and later became an American League umpire and a head linesman for the NFL.

See also
List of second-generation Major League Baseball players

References

External links

Retrosheet
The Baseball Page

1860 births
1940 deaths
Major League Baseball second basemen
19th-century baseball players
Altoona Mountain Citys players
Kansas City Cowboys (UA) players
Chicago Browns/Pittsburgh Stogies players
Baseball players from New Jersey
Sportspeople from Warren County, New Jersey
Haverhill (minor league baseball) players
Burials in New Jersey
Sportspeople from Elizabeth, New Jersey
People from Phillipsburg, New Jersey